Martin Feigenwinter (born 20 March 1970) is a Swiss speed skater. He competed at the 1994 Winter Olympics and the 1998 Winter Olympics.

References

External links
 

1970 births
Living people
Swiss male speed skaters
Olympic speed skaters of Switzerland
Speed skaters at the 1994 Winter Olympics
Speed skaters at the 1998 Winter Olympics
People from Liestal
20th-century Swiss people